Miel Prudencio Ma (also known as Miel or Dengcoy Miel) is a Filipino cartoonist and illustrator. He received the National Cartoonist Society Newspaper Illustration Award of 2001.

Miel's work has been syndicated by the United Feature Syndicate/WittyWorld beginning in 1986, and lately by The New York Times Syndicate (NYTS)/Cartoonists and Writers Syndicate (CWS). His cartoons can also be found in Daryl Cagle's Professional Cartoonists Index website. His cartoons have been published in newspapers such as The International Herald Tribune, Newsweek, Asiaweek, World & I, Japan Times, The New York Times, The Washington Post, The South China Morning Post and World Press Review, among others.

Miel has a master's degree in design (MDes) from the University of New South Wales (UNSW, Sydney).

Formerly the editorial cartoonist of the now-defunct and Ferdinand Marcos-owned Philippine Daily Express, he subsequently became chief editorial cartoonist of The Philippine Star, a broadsheet founded in the post-Marcos year 1986. In 1992, he emigrated to Singapore with his family.

Miel started his Singapore career as the assistant art editor of The Straits Times, Singapore's top English-language daily. He is now its senior executive artist.

Works

As author
 Scenegapore (2012, Epigram Books) 
 An Essential Guide to Singlish (2003, 2010, Gartbooks)  
 Singatoons (2002, Landmark Books)

As co-author
 So Singapore Toons (2008, Singapore Discovery Centre and Popular Book Co)

As illustrator
 An Essential Guide to Pantang!: Taboos and Superstitions of Singapore & Malaysia (2009, Gartbooks) 
 The Midnight Tree (2008, Rainforest Kids) 
 Lost in the Secret Garden (2007, Rainforest Kids) 
 Secret Hoarder (2007, Rainforest Kids) 
 Ben's Friends from the Rainforest (2006, Pixie Books) 
 Peeping @ 2031: Celebrating Institute of Systems Science 25th Anniversary (2006, SNP Editions) 
 Thinking Allowed? Politics, Fear and Change in Singapore (2004, SNP Editions)

References

Filipino cartoonists
Living people
The Philippine Star people
Year of birth missing (living people)